The Meja ambush was an incident that occurred during the NATO bombing of Yugoslavia and the Kosovo War when members of the Kosovo Liberation Army (KLA) ambushed and killed five Serbian policemen and one officer on 21 April 1999 near Mejë, a village in Kosovo. The Serbian policemen were ambushed in a car on a road near the center of Mejë. One of the officers killed was police commander, Milutin Prašević. This ambush was used as a motive for the following Meja Massacre, that happened on 28 April of that year.

See also 
 Meja massacre

References 

Military operations of the Kosovo War
Battles involving FR Yugoslavia
1999 in Kosovo
Conflicts in 1999
Gjakova
Kosovo Liberation Army